Ocotea odorifera is a species of plant in the family Lauraceae. It is an evergreen tree in the genus Ocotea.

It is commonly known as Brazilian sassafras or American cinnamon; though it is not a true sassafras nor a true cinnamon, these plants are close relatives. In trade, the junior synonym Ocotea pretiosa is often used, and there is considerable confusion between the present taxon and Ocotea cymbarum.

Distribution
It is native to Brazil, in the states of Bahia, Minas Gerais, Paraná, Rio de Janeiro, Rio Grande do Sul, Santa Catarina, and São Paulo.

It may also be native to Misiones province of Argentina and to Paraguay, but is unverified there.

It is threatened by habitat loss.

Gallery

References

External links

odorifera
Trees of Brazil
Flora of the Atlantic Forest
Flora of Bahia
Flora of Minas Gerais
Flora of Paraná (state)
Flora of Rio de Janeiro (state)
Flora of Rio Grande do Sul
Flora of Santa Catarina (state)
Flora of São Paulo (state)
Vulnerable flora of South America
Taxonomy articles created by Polbot
Taxobox binomials not recognized by IUCN